Dampiera is a genus of about 70 species of flowering plants in the family Goodeniaceae, all of which are endemic to Australia. Plants in the genus Dampiera are subshrubs or herbs with sessile leaves, flowers with five small sepals and blue, violet or pink, rarely white, two-lipped flowers.

Description
Plants in the genus Dampiera are multistemmed perennial subshrubs or herbs with a rosette of leaves, the leaves simple, sessile and sometimes with tootehd edges. The flowers have five very small sepals and petals joined at the base with two "lips" with unequal lobes. The stamens form a tube around the style and are attached to the petal tube. The fruit is a nut often with parts of the flowers remaining attached, and contains a single seed.

Taxonomy
The genus Dampiera was first formally described in 1810 by Robert Brown in his Prodromus Florae Novae Hollandiae et Insulae Van Diemen. The genus is named for William Dampier, an English sea captain who landed on the north-west coast of Western Australia in 1688 and 1699 and collected about twenty-five species of the first Australian plants to reach European herbaria.

Species list
The following is a list of Dampiera species accepted by the Australian Plant Census as at May 2021:

 Dampiera adpressa A.Cunn. ex DC. - purple beauty-bush
 Dampiera alata Lindl. - winged-stem dampiera
 Dampiera altissima Benth. - tall dampiera
 Dampiera angulata Rajput & Carolin
 Dampiera anonyma Lepschi & Trudgen
 Dampiera atriplicina C.A.Gardner ex Rajput & Carolin
 Dampiera candicans F.Muell.
 Dampiera carinata Benth. - summer dampiera
 Dampiera cinerea Ewart & O.B.Davies
 Dampiera conospermoides W.Fitzg.
 Dampiera coronata Lindl. - wedge-leaved dampiera
 Dampiera decurrens Rajput & Carolin
 Dampiera deltoidea Rajput & Carolin
 Dampiera dentata Rajput
 Dampiera discolor (de Vriese) K.Krause
 Dampiera diversifolia de Vriese
 Dampiera dysantha (Benth.) Rajput & Carolin
 Dampiera eriantha K.Krause
 Dampiera eriocephala de Vriese - woolly-headed dampiera
 Dampiera fasciculata R.Br. - bundled-leaf dampiera
 Dampiera ferruginea R.Br.
 Dampiera fitzgeraldensis Rajput & Carolin
 Dampiera fusca Rajput & Carolin - Kydra dampiera
 Dampiera galbraithiana Rajput & Carolin
 Dampiera glabrescens Benth.
 Dampiera haematotricha de Vriese
 Dampiera hederacea R.Br. - Karri dampiera
 Dampiera heteroptera Rajput & Carolin
 Dampiera incana R.Br. - hoary dampiera
 Dampiera juncea Benth. - rush-like dampiera
 Dampiera krauseana Rajput & Carolin
 Dampiera lanceolata A.Cunn. ex DC. - grooved dampiera
 Dampiera latealata (E.Pritz.) Rajput & Carolin
 Dampiera lavandulacea Lindl.
 Dampiera leptoclada Benth. - slender-shooted dampiera
 Dampiera lindleyi de Vriese
 Dampiera linearis R.Br. - common dampiera
 Dampiera loranthifolia F.Muell. ex Benth.
 Dampiera luteiflora F.Muell. - yellow dampiera
 Dampiera marifolia Benth.
 Dampiera metallorum Lepschi & Trudgen
 Dampiera obliqua Rajput & Carolin 
 Dampiera oligophylla Benth. - sparse-leaved dampiera
 Dampiera orchardii Rajput & Carolin
 Dampiera parvifolia R.Br. - many-bracted dampiera
 Dampiera pedunculata Rajput & Carolin
 Dampiera plumosa S.Moore
 Dampiera purpurea R.Br. - purple dampiera
 Dampiera ramosa Rajput & Carolin
 Dampiera rosmarinifolia Schltdl.
 Dampiera roycei Rajput
 Dampiera sacculata F.Muell. ex Benth. - pouched dampiera
 Dampiera salahae Rajput & Carolin
 Dampiera scaevolina C.A.Gardner ex Rajput & Carolin
 Dampiera scottiana  F.Muell.
 Dampiera sericantha F.Muell. ex Benth.
 Dampiera spicigera Benth. - spiked dampiera
 Dampiera stenophylla K.Krause
 Dampiera stenostachya E.Pritz. - narrow-spiked dampiera
 Dampiera stricta (Sm.) R.Br. - blue dampiera
 Dampiera sylvestris Rajput & Carolin 
 Dampiera tenuicaulis E.Pritz. - slender-stemmed dampiera
 Dampiera tephrea Rajput & Carolin
 Dampiera teres Lindl. - terete-leaved dampiera
 Dampiera tomentosa K.Krause - felted dampiera
 Dampiera trigona de Vriese - angled-stem dampiera
 Dampiera triloba Lindl.
 Dampiera wellsiana F.Muell. - Wells' dampiera

Distribution
Species of Dampiera'' occur in all Australian States, the Northern Territory and the Australian Capital Territory.

References

 
Endemic flora of Australia
Asterales genera